Roopa Ganguly is an Indian actress, playback singer and politician. She is best known for her portrayal of Draupadi in B R Chopra's hit television series Mahabharat. Often promoted as the Tollywood's answer to Bollywood's Shabana Azmi, she is known for her versatility and accent adaptation. She has worked with directors such as Mrinal Sen, Aparna Sen, Goutam Ghose and Rituparno Ghosh. She is a trained Rabindra Sangeet vocalist and a classical dancer. She received several awards including a National Award and two BFJA Awards.   In October 2016, she was nominated as a Member of Parliament, Rajya Sabha, by the President of India. She served as the President of BJP Mahila Morcha in West Bengal. She served as the General Secretary and the Vice President for the West Bengal Motion Picture Artistes' Forum, a body representing cine artistes. Her films have commulatively grossed more than US$100 million worldwide.

Her first acting assignment was Bijoy Chatterjee's Hindi short film Nirupama (1986) based on Rabindranath Tagore's Bengali short story Dena Paona and broadcast on DD National. Her breakthrough role came with the Bengali TV series Muktabandha (1987) directed by Ramaprasad Banik. She made her big screen debut opposite Chiranjeet in Prabhat Roy's Bengali film Prateek (1988). In 1988, she achieved national recognition for her role in the Hindi TV series Ganadevta and shot to wider fame and popularity after she played Draupadi in B. R. Chopra's Mahabharat (1988–90). Her performance in this TV series earned her several awards including Smita Patil Memorial Award. She reprised the role of Draupadi in Chopra's Mahabharat Katha. She acted in  popular Hindi TV series such as Kanoon (1993), Chandrakanta (1994), Karam Apnaa Apnaa (2007), Kasturi (2009), Agle Janam Mohe Bitiya Hi Kijo (2009). Popular Bengali TV series, she acted in, include Janmabhoomi (1997), Draupadi (2000), Ingeet (2001), Tithir Atithi to name a few.

She achieved critical acclaim for her performance in National Award winning Bengali films such as Padma Nadir Majhi (1993) by Goutam Ghose,  Janani (1993) by Sanat Dasgupta and Yugant (1995) by Aparna Sen. She received BFJA Award for Best Supporting Actress twice for her roles in Amal Ray Ghatak's Ujan (1995) and Rituparno Ghosh's Antarmahal (2005). In the same year, she acted in the role of a conceited actress in Anjan Dutt's Tarpor Bhalobasa, which once again earned her critical acclaim. She was conferred with Osian's Cinefan Festival Special Jury Mention for her role in Antarmahal (2005). She was awarded in the Best Actress in a Leading Role category for her role in Sekhar Das's National Award winning Bengali film Krantikaal (2005) at the 9th Dhaka International Film Festival. In January 2006, she was named by The Indian Express in the list of the five most powerful actresses of 2005. She was further acclaimed for her roles in films such as Kaaler Rakhal (2009), Chowrasta - The Crossroads of Love (2009), Chaurahen (2012), Na Hannyate (2012), Dutta Vs Dutta (2012) and Punascha (2014). In 2011, she received the National Film Award for Best Female Playback Singer for rendering her voice in Aditi Roy's Bengali film Abosheshey (2012). Goutam Ghose said that "she has that skill to transform herself into any character she plays." Rituparno Ghosh described her as "a roisterer of pathos and exuberance through the portrayal of her characters."

Early life 
Ganguly was born to Samarendra Lal Ganguly and Juthika Ganguly on 25 November 1963. She grew up in a joint family. She was a student of Beltala Girls' High School from which she finished her secondary examination. She completed her Higher Secondary Education from Jodhpur Park Girls' High School. Later, she obtained a bachelor's degree from the Jogamaya Devi College, an affiliated undergraduate women's college of University of Calcutta, in Kolkata. Ganguly had to face financial problem during her college days.

Acting career
Ganguly never intended to be an actress. After she completed her graduation, she was suggested by some of her relatives to pursue acting. She attended a wedding ceremony where she was introduced to Bijoy Chatterjee who was looking for a fresh face with unplucked eyebrows to play the female lead in his Hindi short film Nirupama (1986) based on Rabindranath Tagore's Bengali short story Dena Paona. Ganguly was initially hesitant to accept his proposal but later gave her nod on the insistence of her aunt. Soumitra Chatterjee who played the father to her character in the film helped her get into the role of the heroine. Impressed with her potential, Soumitra Chatterjee cast her as Mrinal alongside his daughter Poulami Basu playing the role of Bindu in  his directorial venture Stree Ki Patra (1986), based on Streer Patra a Bengali short story written by Tagore.

Ganguly was enjoined by Ramaprasad Banik to appear for a look test for the female lead in his Bengali TV series Muktabandha (1987). After she appeared for the look test, Samaresh Majumdar, the screenplay writer of the TV series considered her to be imperfect for the role. The role being that of a call girl, Majumdar wanted an attractive actress to portray it. He suggested Banik to find another actress other than Ganguly whom he considered to be dowdy. Majumdar was requested to meet Ganguly once again. This time Ganguly appeared charming and attractive, and was finalized to portray the female lead. Her performance in the series was appreciated. She accepted a role opposite Chiranjeet Chakraborty in Prabhat Roy's Bengali film Prateek (1988). Roy's next venture was Agnitrishna (1989) that once again saw Chiranjeet Chakraborty essaying the male protagonist Abhijit suffering from pyrophobia. Roy cast Ganguly as the female lead opposite Chakraborty. She had to enact the role of the doctor who treats the protagonist. The film failed to win critical favour while Ganguly's performance was critically acclaimed. She also accepted another role opposite Chakraborty in Biresh Chatterjee's Bengali film Tufan (1989). The film was a major financial success. She featured in Mrinal Sen's much acclaimed Hindi Film Ek Din Achanak (1989) and Basu Chatterjee's Hindi film Kamla Ki Maut (1989).

Reportedly B.R. Chopra was quite impressed with Ganguly's performance in the TV series Ganadevta. After Juhi Chawla declined the role  of Draupadi for Mahabharat, Chopra decided to get her appear for a screen test for the role. In 1988, she was summoned by director Biresh Chatterjee to NT1 Studio where the director informed her that Chopra wanted her to appear for the look test. Ramya Krishnan was also another strong candidate to portray the role. Ganguly was finally chosen since her Hindi diction was better. In 1989, the 34th episode of the series introduced her. She was hailed for her performance in the Game of Dice sequence. The sequence was aired in the 46th, 47th and 48th episodes of the series. The sequence narrates Draupadi being dragged to the court by Dushasana. She then asks Bhishma, a veteran of the Kuru clan whether Yudhishthira has the right to put her in stake. The sequence demanded her to weep while enacting the part. She was so engrossed that she wept on even after her shot was over. She later claimed that her performance in the TV series was quite mediocre.

Ganguly received wide attention from Bollywood media and producers for her role in Chopra's Mahabharat, yet she never had a significant elevation in her Bollywood career. She said that things became very hard since she was an outsider and had to face the problem of casting couch. She featured as Rama in Tariq Shah's Hindi film Baahar Aane Tak (1990). The film did not meet financial success. Onwards, she appeared in films such as K. Bapayya's Pyar Ka Devta (1991), Raj Sippy's Saugandh (1991) and Rajkumar Kohli's Virodhi (1992) to name a few. In 1991, she acted in the blockbuster Kannada film Police Matthu Dada, directed by Tulsi Ramsay and Shyam Ramsay. In the same year, she appeared in its Hindi remake titled Inspector Dhanush. The film flopped at the box office. In 1992, she acted in A. V. Seshagiri Rao's Telugu film Inspector Bhavani, where she played the character of a sincere police officer whose object is to bring an end to those who assassinated her fiancée. In the same year, she acted in Sukanta Roy's Bengali film Pitrireen, where she played the character of Sathi, a photographer who inquires about her father's assassin.

In 1993, she appeared in Goutam Ghose's award-winning Bengali film Padma Nadir Majhi, where she played the character of Kapila, a woman from the fishermen community who falls for her sister's husband and finally leaves her family to settle with him on Moynadeep island. Her performance in this film was appreciated by the critics and media personalities.  Utpal Dutt, who was also a part of this venture, was recorded to comment on her performance: "Roopa has really lived the life of Kapila with those flawless body languages of a woman from the fisherman community."

In 1995, She accepted a role in Ravi Chopra's Kanoon on the latter's insistence. In 1995, she appeared in Amal Roy Ghatak's Bengali film Ujan, which won her the BFJA Award for Best Supporting Actress in 1996. In 1996, she appeared in Aparna Sen's award-winning Bengali film Yugant, where she played the character of an obsessed dancer. Her performance in the film won favourable reviews. Apart from acting in feature films, she went on appearing in numerous telefilms and television series, both in Bengali and Hindi, including Sukanya (1998).

In 2000, she appeared in Rituparno Ghosh's award-winning Bengali film Bariwali, where she played the character of Sudeshna Mitra, an actress playing the character of Binodini, in a film Chokher Bali directed, alongside the male protagonist. In 2001, she appeared in a cameo role in Goutam Ghose's award-winning Bengali film Dekha. Though she made a cameo appearance in it, she garnered huge mass attention as the film was widely advertised on her enthralling dialogue; "Sagar dekhben naa, shudhu amake dekhun." In the film, she rendered her character with a fine, seductive approach, especially in the Eki Labonyo Purna Prate song sequence, where the character played by Soumitra Chatterjee recalls an earlier moment of Ganguly gazing back at him. In 2003, she appeared in Gautam Ghose's Bengali film Abar Aranye, where she played the character of Shimul, a buoyant woman who is grief-stricken at the deepest core of her heart for the probable loss of her husband. She appeared in a cameo role in Bow Barracks Forever (2004) by Anjan Dutt.

In 2005, she appeared in Rituparno Ghosh's award-winning Bengali film Antarmahal, where she played the character of Mahamaya, a docile wife to an arrogant zamindar. Her performance in the film was hugely appreciated by film critics. Indian film critic Piyush Roy wrote on her performance in the film, "Ganguly rekindles memories of her fiery act of Draupadi in B R Chopra’s Mahabharat through her blow hot, blow cold performance."

She herself considered this role as a big challenge as it was inherently contrary to her personality. The film won her the BFJA Award for Best Supporting Actress in 2006. Reportedly Mira Nair was all praise for Ganguly's performance in the film after the former had attended a private screening of the film in USA. Nair proposed her to play the role of Asima's mother in The Namesake. Ganguly eschewed the offer since the role was not meaty enough. She then, featured in Sekhar Das's award-winning Bengali film Krantikaal (2005), where she played the character of Subarna, who befriends a terrorist who broke into her house. She appeared in Raj Mukherjee's Bengali film Nagordola (2005), where she portrayed the character of an arrogant and rude woman who gets diagnosed as having throat cancer and realises that life is not like it has conventionally been and gives her full consent to her own unmarried daughter to give birth of her baby and to bring it up. The film was a major hit at the box office for its contemporary social issue. Her performance in the film earn her an Anandalok Award nomination in the Best Actress in the Leading Role category in 2006. She acted in the much acclaimed Bengali film Ek Mutho Chabi (2005), produced by herself, where she played the character of an established actress who has a car accident, consequently losing her career. In December 2005, Ganguly was named by The Telegraph in the list of Five Crowning Queens of 2005 alongside Rani Mukerji, Preity Zinta, Konkona Sen Sharma and Vidya Balan.

In 2006, she accepted a role of a writer in Karam Apnaa Apnaa produced by Balaji Telefilms and shifted her base to Mumbai. She then appeared in Hindi TV series such as Love Story and Agle Janam Mohe Bitiya Hi Kijo (2009).

In 2009, she appeared in Sekhar Das's Bengali film Kaaler Rakhal. She appeared in Anjan Dutt's film Chowrasta the Crossroads of love (2009).

In 2011, she won the National Film Award for Best Female Playback Singer for rendering her voice in Aditi Roy's Bengali film Abosheshey (2012) where she also acted. In the film, she portrayed the character of Suchismita. She appeared in Birsa Dasgupta's Jaani Dyakha Hawbe (2011), which after much commercial expectation proved to be a failure at the box office.

She acted in Anurag Basu's blockbuster film Barfi! (2012). She acted in Anjan Dutt's Dutta Vs Dutta, (2012) where she played the character of "Runu mashi", who lives her life on her own terms and inspires the protagonist to live the life he desires. She featured in Joydeep Ghosh's Mayabazar (2012). The film has three individual stories. She played the protagonist in the story Smriti which is based on Dehantar by Sharadindu Bandopadhyay. She played Kuhu, a widow who sees her deceased husband in every single man she dates. She appeared in Riingo's Bengali film Na Hannyate (2012), where she played the character of Jui, who is caught in a situation where she could save only one of her kids and leave the other to die. In 2013, she appeared in Utsav Mukherjee's hilarious social-satirical film Half Serious. She played the role of goddess Durga in the film. She appeared in Rana Basu's Bengali film Namte Namte (2013).  She also appeared in Shekhar Das's Bengali film Nayanchampar Dinratri (2013). In 2014, she appeared alongside Soumitra Chatterjee in Souvik Mitra's Bengali film Punascha, where she played the muse of an award-winning author, played by Chatterjee. The film earned her rave reviews including the statement made by The Times of India that the film belongs to her only. In 2015, she acted in Debesh Chottopadhyay's Bengali film Natoker Moto and Aparna Sen's Bengali film Arshinagar. She was offered the role of Jiji in Kushan Nandy's Babumoshai Bandookbaaz (2017), but was later replaced by Divya Dutta.

She will be seen to portray Bithika Mitra in Meyebela a Bengali TV series produced by Surinder Films. It revolves around a joint family of Hazra Ln, South Kolkata.

Politics 
In 2015, Ganguly joined Bharatiya Janata Party ahead of 2016 West Bengal Legislative Assembly election and quit Artiste Forum since she believed that a political figure should not hold a significant designation in Artiste Forum.

In West Bengal Assembly elections 2016, Ganguly lost from Howrah North to Trinamool Congress counterpart and cricketer Laxmi Ratan Shukla.

She was nominated to the Rajya Sabha in October 2016 in place of cricketer Navjot Singh Sidhu, who resigned earlier.

Personal life 
Ganguly was married to Dhrubo Mukerjee, a mechanical engineer hailing from West Bengal, Kolkata from 1992 until 2007. They have one child, a son, born in 1997, Aakash Mukherjee. She was in a live-in relationship with the Bengali singer Dibyendu Mukherjee. They lived in Ganguly's flat in Mumbai until the end of their relationship. Ganguly maintained a pleasant formality whenever she met Mukherjee after their separation.

Awards and recognitions

Awards
Ganguly had won numerous awards, including a National Award, Bengal Film Journalists' Association Awards two times and Kalakar Awards three times. In 2011, she was awarded the National Film Award for Best Female Playback Singer for rendering her voice in Aditi Roy's Bengali film Abosheshey. She was awarded for her husky and haunting voice in the songs Dure Kothay and Aji Bijan Ghare.

Recognition
 Social and cultural anthropologist Purnima Mankekar's ethnography of television-viewing in India, Screening Culture, Viewing Politics: An Ethnography of Television, Womanhood, and Nation in Postcolonial India, published by Duke University Press in 1999, features a still shot of Ganguly as Draupadi on its cover.

Filmography

English films

Italian film

Hindi films

Hindi TV series

Bengali films

Bengali TV series

Odia Film

Telugu films

Kannada films

Malayalam film

Assamese film

Discography

Radio programme

Notes

References

External links
 

1966 births
Actresses in Bengali cinema
Actresses in Malayalam cinema
Contestants on Indian game shows
Actresses in Hindi cinema
Indian film actresses
Indian television actresses
Jogamaya Devi College alumni
Kalakar Awards winners
Living people
Politicians from Kolkata
University of Calcutta alumni
Bharatiya Janata Party politicians from West Bengal
Nominated members of the Rajya Sabha
Actresses from Kolkata
Women in West Bengal politics
Indian actor-politicians
21st-century Indian actresses
20th-century Indian actresses
21st-century Indian women politicians
21st-century Indian politicians
Actresses in Telugu cinema
Actresses in Assamese cinema
Actresses in Odia cinema
Actresses in Kannada cinema
Women members of the Rajya Sabha
Best Female Playback Singer National Film Award winners
Rajya Sabha members from the Bharatiya Janata Party